Stargate comics are a series of comic books based on the 1994 science-fiction film of the same name, and the TV series Stargate SG-1 (1997–2006) and the spin-off Stargate Atlantis (2004–2009). The initial comics were tie-ins with the film and the later output by Avatar Press has been based on the two TV series.

Movie comic sequels
A series of Stargate film-related comics were published by the independent publishing house Entity Comics between 1996 and 1997, under the creative direction of John Migliore and Bill Maus. Along with a four-part comic book adaptation of the Stargate motion picture and three-part adaption of Bill McCay's StarGate: Rebellion, Entity Comics also wrote their own continuation of the Stargate film. StarGate: One Nation Under Ra and StarGate: Underworld were later published as a trade paperback titled StarGate: The New Adventures Collection.

StarGate: Doomsday World

Part I - Published in November 1996
Part I begins with introducing Dr. Joel Murphy, a scientist who was put in charge of the StarGate program on Earth. After an alien corpse is discovered in the South Pacific ocean near a mysterious island, a military team led by Dr. Murphy and Commander Alexandria Klaus is sent to investigate. Ancient ruins that could provide a link between the Aztec and Egyptian cultures are discovered on the island, but the team is attacked by an alien warrior, who manages to kill one of the team members. The alien is impervious to their weapons, and is clad in armor made from the same quartz-like material that all Ra's technology is based upon. Dr. Murphy manages to immobilize the warrior by electrocuting it with some technology he brought with him, but the electricity reacts with the quartz mineral worn by the alien, and causes it to explode. After the battle, the team continues on, and finds a second StarGate partially buried under tons of rubble.

Part II - Published in December 1996
With the StarGate partially buried under tons of rock, the team decides that their primary objective of moving it is impossible as they lack the necessary excavation materials. With the alien attack, they realize that it is possible that more aliens may come through, and pose a threat to Earth and its inhabitants. Dr. Murphy is ordered to find a way to permanently seal the StarGate, or they will have to fall back on their final back-up plan, which is to drop nuclear bombs on the island. Dr. Murphy examines the StarGate, and discovers that it is different from the 'Gate in Creek Mountain; it is most likely a prototype, and as such it operates differently. The team soon discovers that the island is inhabited when the natives, led by a woman named Regalia, tells them to leave the island or they will attack Dr. Murphy and Commander Klaus' team in defense of the "Great Gift of Ra." Commander Klaus attempts to explain the dire nature of the Stargate and the danger that it poses, but Regalia remains unconvinced. A fight breaks out between the two groups, and Dr. Murphy goes back to the StarGate to see what he can do to shut it down for good. Upon arrival, he finds another team member already attempting to do the same, but the soldier accidentally activates the Stargate and gets sucked through. The StarGate shuts off and Dr. Murphy begins his work, until the StarGate is activated again...from the other side. Another alien warrior, identical to the original guardian, emerges from the StarGate, and Regalia breaks off her fight to greet the "Herald of Ra." Her greeting is met with a blast from the alien warrior's weapons, and Regalia decides that maybe Commander Klaus was right about the danger from the StarGate. Dr. Murphy is able to stop the warrior by sending an electronic signal to the prototype StarGate, which activates the StarGate and causes it to attract objects made from the same mineral as itself. The alien warrior is sucked back through the StarGate, but it malfunctions and closes while it is only halfway through. Commander Klaus is concerned that the half of the warrior sent back to its origin might be regarded as an act of war. They decide that the situation has escalated too far, and that the only option left is to nuke the island.

Part III - Published in January 1997
Commander Klaus begins the evacuation of the island's inhabitants and the other members of her team. She, along with Dr. Murphy and several other soldiers, decide to remain behind and hold off any aliens for as long as possible; if a single alien made it through the StarGate and off the island before the nukes are dropped, it could spell doom for the rest of the planet. After the evacuation is complete and the other people are at a safe distance from the island, Commander Klaus discovers that Regalia is still with them, and is also going to help them hold out against any aliens. True to their prediction, the StarGate activates again, but this time a whole group of alien warriors emerge. A battle breaks out between them, but when the aliens detect the nukes closing in on the island, they retreat back through the StarGate. The team is left behind to face a certain death, until Dr. Murphy realizes that since the Stargate is a prototype, and operates differently from the other StarGate, he might be able to use it differently. He manages to use it to match up with the StarGate in Creek Mountain, and along with Commander Klaus, Regalia and the other surviving soldiers, he uses it to escape the island, which is destroyed seconds after their escape.

StarGate: One Nation Under Ra

Part I of I - Published in April 1997
Dr. Joel Murphy returns from Abydos, where Dr. Daniel Jackson filled in some gaps in Dr. Murphy's data about the StarGate and the quartz-like material it's made of. He plans on returning immediately with survival gear for Dr. Jackson. Although his new assistant Katerina Moffat advises him to wait due to the severe electrical storm outside of the StarGate facility in Creek Mountain, Dr. Murphy insists on travelling through the Stargate to Abydos. Upon reaching the other side of the StarGate, Dr. Murphy finds himself upon a platform in the middle of a large, opulent city rather than in the center of the pyramid on Abydos. The city resembles Ancient Egypt, but on a much larger, high-tech scale. Dr. Murphy deduces that the electrical storm did have an effect on the operation of the StarGate, and that he is on an entirely different planet. After noticing a large spacecraft identical to Ra's flying palace, he hears loud voices closing on his position. As he is a stranger from the StarGate, a group of Horus Guards attempt to capture him and bring him to "Ra." Dr. Murphy escapes into a crowd of people, plans on biding his time until he can use the Stargate to get back to Earth. As he dashes through the crowd, he accidentally knocks over a young woman. As he apologizes and continues to run away, a large man walks over to the woman. Her name is Shaun'tra, the leader of this world's rebellion against this "Ra," and the man is Moh-tahn, her faithful friend and confidant. Shaun'tra suspects that this "Ra" is an impostor, but is every bit as ruthless as the true Ra and must be deposed. Meanwhile, Dr. Murphy continues to evade capture, but is hunted by the same type of alien warrior he faced on the "Doomsday" island. He conjectures that this world is their home planet. Using the survival gear intended for Dr. Jackson on Abydos, Dr. Murphy attempts to hide in an approaching sandstorm. The alien warrior is able to discover him, however, and succeeds in capturing Dr. Murphy. Elsewhere, in the city, Shaun'tra decides that now is the time to organize their revolt against the impostor Ra. Back in false Ra's palace, Dr. Murphy is brought before him. Murphy tells the impostor that he knows that the real Ra is dead, and that the ruler standing before him is a fake. The impostor admits to this charge, and says his name is Pharat-kah, Ra's successor. When Ra never returned from Abydos, Pharat-kah knew that the world he was on would be thrown into chaos if they discovered that Ra was dead. He set himself up as Ra, claiming to have returned from Abydos. His story is interrupted, however, as the revolt led by Shaun'tra begins, and the palace is attacked. Dr. Murphy is released by Shaun'tra, and makes his way to the StarGate, escaping through it to Earth moments before it is obliterated by the sandstorm and the angry rebels.

StarGate: Underworld
Part I of I - Published May 1997
The StarGate program on Earth has been unable to contact Abydos for several weeks, and Dr. Murphy assumes that the StarGate on Abydos has been shut down from the other side. They bring in the new military advisor, Colonel Jonathan "Jack" O'Neil, in hope that he will have some answers. Dr. Murphy, Katerina, Commander Klaus, and Catherine Langford each brief Colonel O'Neil on the current political situation on Abydos. Last time they were in contact with Abydos, there were three separate factions: the first had embraced help from Earth, and was led by Daniel Jackson; the second blamed Earth for all their current problems and, led by a person named Rhantaa, wanted the StarGate shut down for good; and the third group, which includes Kasuf among its members, refuses to believe that Ra is dead, or at the very least expects to see the rise of a successor. The people at the StarGate program have become concerned that the current political situation is responsible for the lack of contact with Abydos. Dr. Murphy believes that he might be able to force the StarGate open for a brief period of time, but only long enough for a one-person jump. O'Neil is sent through to try to figure out what's wrong on Abydos. Upon arrival, O'Neil is confronted by Skaara and a group of armed Abydans, who attempt to take him under custody. Daniel Jackson arrives on the scene, and when O'Neil asks him what is going on. Dr. Jackson tells him that the Abydans blame him for their troubles, and that he must be placed under protective custody, and that he must stand trial for his "crimes." After O'Neil is imprisoned to await his trial, Dr. Jackson and his wife Sha'uri come to visit him and give him the answers O'Neil wants. Apparently, after the death of Ra, the Abydan people began speaking of ghosts from the underworld. Dr. Jackson had originally just thought that it was yet another superstition based on ancient Egyptian myths, until he was attacked by one himself. The "ghost" was actually an outlaw who had not been seen by the Abydan people for years, and was assumed to be dead. Afterwards, Daniel discovered that there was a whole group of these outlaws who were actually living underground, hiding from Ra. When they learned of Ra's death, they decided to take over the surface world. The three political factions of Abydos temporarily joined forces to increase their chances against the outlaws, but tensions are still running high. Dr. Jackson tells O'Neil that he himself shut off the StarGate, knowing that if it had been left active the Underworlders would have destroyed it. Leaving it intact still allowed a chance that someone from Earth could get through. The next day, O'Neil's trial is held, and he is charged with destroying the society on Abydos and for disturbing religious beliefs of the community. Daniel Jackson is able to clear his name before the Abydan people, and they are able to move on to the Underworlder problem. O'Neil discovers the entrance to the Underworlder base, and assembles a team of warriors from all three factions to attack it. The battle is fierce, but O'Neil manages to destroy several basins of oil kept near the Underworlder camp, which in turn ignites a gas deposit under the ground. The enemy camp is obliterated, and with the three Abydan factions united once more, and O'Neil returns to Earth.

Comics based on the TV series

Since 2003 the franchise has passed to Avatar Press. There has been no official word as to whether or not the comics are canon.

All series, including preview and special issues, feature several different, alternate limited edition covers for each issue. These usually include painted covers (featuring artists like Lucio Rubira and Ryan Drake), photo covers, wraparound covers, gold, platinum or blue foil covers, leather covers, and glow-in-the-dark covers. Preview and special issues also get special covers usually available only at comic conventions alongside the Convention Special comics.

Dynamite Entertainment announced in 2009 that they had acquired the license for the comic books based on the Stargate television franchise.

Stargate SG-1
Based on the Stargate SG-1 television show, these are a collection of successive limited series, each featuring a story by James Anthony and art by Jorge Correa.

In 2010 the franchise's publisher changed to Dynamite and they published two Stargate miniseries. These series have the distinction of being the only Stargate SG-1 comic series to leave off the "SG-1" and are simply titled "Stargate."

Stargate Atlantis
In 2006, Avatar Press released the first comic book in a series based on the Stargate Atlantis television show. Set in season 1, Wraithfall features story by Stuart Moore and art by Mauricio Melo. In this story, the Atlantis team meets the Karrans, a race that has made a bizarre deal with the Wraith.

In 2016, American Mythology launched the first Stargate Atlantis comic since 2007.

Stargate Universe
In June 2017, American Mythology released the first comic book in a series based on the Stargate Universe television show. It is set after the end of season two, however the original creators and writers are not involved. While Eli races against time to repair his damaged stasis pod, a new danger to the ship threatens the fragile plan meant to keep everyone alive.

Notes

References

External links
 Stargate SG-1 and Stargate Atlantis Comic Books at Avatar Press

Comics
Lists of comics